The stab-in-the-back myth was an antisemitic conspiracy theory that was widely believed and promulgated in Germany after 1918. It maintained that the Imperial German Army did not lose World War I on the battlefield, but was instead betrayed by certain citizens on the home front—especially Jews, revolutionary socialists who fomented strikes and labor unrest, and other republican politicians who had overthrown the House of Hohenzollern in the German Revolution of 1918–1919. Advocates of the myth denounced the German government leaders who had signed the Armistice of 11 November 1918 as the "November criminals".

When Adolf Hitler and the Nazi Party rose to power in 1933, they made the conspiracy theory an integral part of their official history of the 1920s, portraying the Weimar Republic as the work of the "November criminals" who had "stabbed the nation in the back" in order to seize power. Nazi propaganda depicted Weimar Germany as "a morass of corruption, degeneracy, national humiliation, ruthless persecution of the honest 'national opposition'—fourteen years of rule by Jews, Marxists, and 'cultural Bolsheviks', who had at last been swept away by the National Socialist movement under Hitler and the victory of the 'national revolution' of 1933".

Historians inside and outside of Germany unanimously reject the myth, pointing out that the Imperial German Army was out of reserves, was being overwhelmed by the entrance of the United States into the war, and had already lost the war militarily by late 1918.

Background

In the later part of World War I, Germany was essentially transformed into a military dictatorship, with the Supreme High Command and General Field Marshal Paul von Hindenburg as commander-in-chief advising Emperor Wilhelm II – although Hindenburg was largely a figurehead, with his Chief-of-Staff, First Quartermaster General Erich Ludendorff, effectively in control of the state and the army. Following the passage of the Reichstag Peace Resolution, the Army pressured the Emperor to remove Reich Chancellor Theobald von Bethmann Hollweg and replace him with weak and relatively unknown figures (Georg Michaelis and Georg von Hertling) who were de facto puppets of Ludendorff.

The Allies had been amply resupplied by the United States, which also had fresh armies ready for combat, but the United Kingdom and France were too war-weary to contemplate an invasion of Germany with its unknown consequences. On the Western Front, although the Hindenburg Line had been penetrated and German forces were in retreat, the Allied army had not reached the western German frontier, and on the Eastern Front, Germany had already won the war against Russia, concluded with the Treaty of Brest-Litovsk. In the West, Germany had successes with the Spring Offensive of 1918 but the attack had run out of momentum, the Allies had regrouped and in the Hundred Days Offensive retaken lost ground with no sign of stopping.  Contributing to the Dolchstoßlegende, the overall failure of the German offensive was blamed on strikes in the arms industry at a critical moment, leaving soldiers without an adequate supply of materiel. The strikes were seen as having been instigated by treasonous elements, with the Jews taking most of the blame.

The weakness of Germany's strategic position was exacerbated by the rapid collapse of the other Central Powers in late 1918, following Allied victories on the Macedonian and Italian fronts. Bulgaria was the first to sign an armistice on 29 September 1918, at Salonica. On 30 October   the Ottoman Empire capitulated at Mudros. On 3 November  Austria-Hungary sent a flag of truce to ask for an armistice. The terms, arranged by telegraph with the Allied Authorities in Paris, were communicated to the Austrian commander and accepted. The Armistice with Austria-Hungary was signed in the Villa Giusti, near Padua, on 3 November. Austria and Hungary signed separate treaties following the collapse of the Austro-Hungarian empire.

After the last German offensive on the Western Front failed in 1918, Hindenburg and Ludendorff admitted that the war effort was doomed, and they pressed Kaiser Wilhelm II for an armistice to be negotiated, and for a rapid change to a civilian government in Germany. They began to take steps to deflect the blame for losing the war from themselves and the German Army to others. Ludendorff said to his staff on 1 October:

I have asked His Excellency to now bring those circles to power which we have to thank for coming so far. We will therefore now bring those gentlemen into the ministries. They can now make the peace which has to be made. They can eat the broth which they have prepared for us!

In this way, Ludendorff was setting up the republican politicians – many of them Socialists – who would be brought into the government, and would become the parties that negotiated the Armistice with the Allies, as the scapegoats to take the blame for losing the war, instead of himself and Hindenburg. Normally, during wartime an armistice is negotiated between the military commanders of the hostile forces, but Hindenburg and Ludendorff had instead handed this task to the new civilian government. The attitude of the military was "[T]he parties of the left have to take on the odium of this peace. The storm of anger will then turn against them," after which the military could step in again to ensure that things would once again be run "in the old way". 

On 5 October, the German Chancellor, Prince Maximilian of Baden, contacted American President Woodrow Wilson, indicating that Germany was willing to accept his Fourteen Points as a basis for discussions.  Wilson's response insisted that Germany institute parliamentary democracy, give up the territory it had gained to that point in the war, and significantly disarm, including giving up the German High Seas Fleet. On 26 October, Ludendorff was dismissed from his post by the Emperor and replaced by Lieutenant General Wilhelm Groener, who started to prepare the withdrawal and demobilisation of the army.

On 11 November 1918, the representatives of the newly formed Weimar Republic – created after the Revolution of 1918–1919 forced the abdication of the Kaiser – signed the armistice that ended hostilities. The military commanders had arranged it so that they would not be blamed for suing for peace, but the republican politicians associated with the armistice would: the signature on the armistice document was of Matthias Erzberger, who was later murdered for his alleged treason.

Given that the heavily censored German press had carried nothing but news of victories throughout the war, and that Germany itself was unoccupied while occupying a great deal of foreign territory, it was no wonder that the German public was mystified by the request for an armistice, especially as they did not know that their military leaders had asked for it, nor did they know that the German Army had been in full retreat after their last offensive had failed.

Thus the conditions were set for the "stab-in-the-back myth", in which Hindenburg and Ludendorff were held to be blameless, the German Army was seen as undefeated on the battlefield,  and the republican politicians – especially the Socialists – were accused of betraying Germany. Further blame was laid at their feet after they signed the Treaty of Versailles in 1919, which led to territorial losses and serious financial pain for the shaky new republic, including a crippling schedule of reparation payments.

Conservatives, nationalists and ex-military leaders began to speak critically about the peace and Weimar politicians, socialists, communists and German Jews. Even Catholics were viewed with suspicion by some due to supposed fealty to the Pope and their presumed lack of national loyalty and patriotism. It was claimed that these groups had not sufficiently supported the war and had played a role in selling out Germany to its enemies. These November Criminals, or those who seemed to benefit from the newly formed Weimar Republic, were seen to have "stabbed them in the back" on the home front, by either criticizing German nationalism, instigating unrest and mounting strikes in the critical military industries or, by profiteering. These actions were believed to have deprived Germany of almost certain victory at the eleventh hour.

Origins of the myth

According to historian Richard Steigmann-Gall, the stab-in-the-back concept can be traced back to a sermon preached on 3 February 1918, by Protestant Court Chaplain Bruno Doehring, nine months before the war had even ended. German scholar Boris Barth, in contrast to Steigmann-Gall, implies that Doehring did not actually use the term, but spoke only of 'betrayal'. Barth traces the first documented use to a centrist political meeting in the Munich Löwenbräu-Keller on November 2,  1918, in which Ernst Müller-Meiningen, a member of the Progressive People's Party in the Reichstag, used the term to exhort his listeners to keep fighting:

As long as the front holds, we damned well have the duty to hold out in the homeland. We would have to be ashamed of ourselves in front of our children and grandchildren if we attacked the battle front from the rear and gave it a dagger-stab. (wenn wir der Front in den Rücken fielen und ihr den Dolchstoß versetzten.)

However, the widespread dissemination and acceptance of the "stab-in-the-back" myth came about through its use by Germany's highest military echelon. In Spring 1919, Max Bauer – an Army colonel who had been the primary advisor to Ludendorff on politics and economics – published Could We Have Avoided, Won, or Broken Off the War?, in which he wrote that "[The war] was lost only and exclusively through the failure of the homeland." The birth of the specific term "stab-in-the-back" itself can possibly be dated to the autumn of 1919, when Ludendorff was dining with the head of the British Military Mission in Berlin, British general Sir Neill Malcolm. Malcolm asked Ludendorff why he thought Germany lost the war. Ludendorff replied with his list of excuses, including that the home front failed the army.

Malcolm asked him: "Do you mean, General, that you were stabbed in the back?" Ludendorff's eyes lit up and he leapt upon the phrase like a dog on a bone. "Stabbed in the back?" he repeated. "Yes, that's it, exactly, we were stabbed in the back". And thus was born a legend which has never entirely perished.

The phrase was to Ludendorff's liking, and he let it be known among the general staff that this was the "official" version, which led to it being spread throughout German society. It was picked up by right-wing political factions, and was even used by Kaiser Wilhelm II in the memoirs he wrote in the 1920s. Right-wing groups used it as a form of attack against the early Weimar Republic government, led by the Social Democratic Party (SPD), which had come to power with the abdication of the Kaiser. However, even the SPD had a part in furthering the myth when Reichspräsident Friedrich Ebert, the party leader, told troops returning to Berlin on 10 November 1918 that "No enemy has vanquished you," (kein Feind hat euch überwunden!) and "they returned undefeated from the battlefield" (sie sind vom Schlachtfeld unbesiegt zurückgekehrt). The latter quote was shortened to im Felde unbesiegt ("undefeated on the battlefield") as a semi-official slogan of the Reichswehr. Ebert had meant these sayings as a tribute to the German soldier, but it only contributed to the prevailing feeling.

Further "proof" of the myth's validity was found in British General Frederick Barton Maurice's book The Last Four Months, published in 1919. German reviews of the book misrepresented it as proving that the German army had been betrayed on the home front by being "dagger-stabbed from behind by the civilian populace" (von der Zivilbevölkerung von hinten erdolcht), an interpretation that Maurice disavowed in the German press, to no effect. According to William L. Shirer, Ludendorff used the reviews of the book to convince Hindenburg about the validity of the myth.

On 18 November 1919, Ludendorff and Hindenburg appeared before the Committee of Inquiry into Guilt for World War I of the newly elected Weimar National Assembly, which was investigating the causes of the World War and Germany's defeat. The two generals appeared in civilian clothing, explaining publicly that to wear their uniforms would show too much respect to the commission. Hindenburg refused to answer questions from the chairman, and instead read a statement that had been written by Ludendorff. In his testimony he cited what Maurice was purported to have written, which provided his testimony's most memorable part. Hindenburg declared at the end of his – or Ludendorff's – speech: "As an English general has very truly said, the German Army was 'stabbed in the back'".

Furthering, the specifics of what the stab-in-the-back myth are mentioned briefly by Kaiser Wilhelm II in his memoir:I immediately summoned Field Marshal von Hindenburg and the Quartermaster General, General Gröner. General Gröner again announced that the army could fight no longer and wished rest above all else, and that, therefore, any sort of armistice must be unconditionally accepted; that the armistice must be concluded as soon as possible, since the army had supplies for only six to eight days more and was cut off from all further supplies by the rebels, who had occupied all the supply storehouses and Rhine bridges; that, for some unexplained reason, the armistice commission sent to France–consisting of Erzberger, Ambassador Count Oberndorff, and General von Winterfeldt–which had crossed the French lines two evenings before, had sent no report as to the nature of the conditions.Paul von Hindenburg, Chief of the Great General Staff at the time of the Ludendorff Offensive, also mentioned this event in a statement explaining the Kaiser’s abdication:The conclusion of the armistice was directly impending. At moment of the highest military tension revolution broke out in Germany, the insurgents seized the Rhine bridges, important arsenals, and traffic centres in the rear of the army, thereby endangering the supply of ammunition and provisions, while the supplies in the hands of the troops were only enough to last for a few days.

The troops on the lines of communication and the reserves disbanded themselves, and unfavourable reports arrived concerning the reliability of the field army proper.It was particularly this testimony of Hindenburg that led to the widespread acceptance of the Dolchstoßlegende in post-World War I Germany.

Antisemitic aspects

The antisemitic instincts of the German Army were revealed well before the stab-in-the-back myth became the military's excuse for losing the war. In October 1916, in the middle of the war, the army ordered a Jewish census of the troops, with the intent to show that Jews were under-represented in the Heer (army), and that they were over-represented in non-fighting positions. Instead, the census showed just the opposite, that Jews were over-represented both in the army as a whole and in fighting positions at the front. The Imperial German Army then suppressed the results of the census.

Charges of a Jewish conspiratorial element in Germany's defeat drew heavily upon figures such as Kurt Eisner, a Berlin-born German Jew who lived in Munich. He had written about the illegal nature of the war from 1916 onward, and he also had a large hand in the Munich revolution until he was assassinated in February 1919. The Weimar Republic under Friedrich Ebert violently suppressed workers' uprisings with the help of Gustav Noske and Reichswehr General Groener, and tolerated the paramilitary Freikorps forming all across Germany. In spite of such tolerance, the Republic's legitimacy was constantly attacked with claims such as the stab-in-the-back. Many of its representatives such as Matthias Erzberger and Walther Rathenau were assassinated, and the leaders were branded as "criminals" and Jews by the right-wing press dominated by Alfred Hugenberg.

Anti-Jewish sentiment was intensified by the Bavarian Soviet Republic (6 April – 3 May 1919), a communist government which briefly ruled the city of Munich before being crushed by the Freikorps. Many of the Bavarian Soviet Republic's leaders were Jewish, allowing antisemitic propagandists to connect Jews with Communism, and thus treason.

In 1919, Deutschvölkischer Schutz und Trutzbund ("German Nationalist Protection and Defiance Federation") leader Alfred Roth, writing under the pseudonym "Otto Arnim", published the book The Jew in the Army which he said was based on evidence gathered during his participation on the Judenzählung, a military census which had in fact shown that German Jews had served in the front lines proportionately to their numbers. Roth's work claimed that most Jews involved in the war were only taking part as profiteers and spies, while he also blamed Jewish officers for fostering a defeatist mentality which impacted negatively on their soldiers. As such, the book offered one of the earliest published versions of the stab-in-the-back legend.

A version of the stab-in-the-back myth was publicized in 1922 by the anti-Semitic Nazi theorist Alfred Rosenberg in his primary contribution to Nazi theory on Zionism, Der Staatsfeindliche Zionismus ("Zionism, the Enemy of the State"). Rosenberg accused German Zionists of working for a German defeat and supporting Britain and the implementation of the Balfour Declaration.

Aftermath
The Dolchstoß was a central image in propaganda produced by the many right-wing and traditionally conservative political parties that sprang up in the early days of the Weimar Republic, including Hitler's Nazi Party. For Hitler himself, this explanatory model for World War I was of crucial personal importance. He had learned of Germany's defeat while being treated for temporary blindness following a gas attack on the front. In Mein Kampf, he described a vision at this time which drove him to enter politics. Throughout his career, he railed against the "November criminals" of 1918, who had stabbed the German Army in the back.

The German historian Friedrich Meinecke attempted to trace the roots of the expression "stab-in-the-back" in a 11 June 1922 article in the Viennese newspaper Neue Freie Presse. In the 1924 national election, the Munich cultural journal Süddeutsche Monatshefte published a series of articles blaming the SPD and trade unions for Germany's defeat in World War I, which came out during the trial of Adolf Hitler and Ludendorff for high treason following the Beer Hall Putsch in 1923. The editor of an SPD newspaper sued the journal for defamation, giving rise to what is known as the Munich Dolchstoßprozess from 19 October to 20 November 1925. Many prominent figures testified in that trial, including members of the parliamentary committee investigating the reasons for the defeat, so some of its results were made public long before the publication of the committee report in 1928.

World War II

The Allied policy of unconditional surrender was devised in 1943 in part to avoid a repetition of the stab-in-the-back myth. According to historian John Wheeler-Bennett, speaking from the British perspective,It was necessary for the Nazi régime and/or the German Generals to surrender unconditionally in order to bring home to the German people that they had lost the War by themselves; so that their defeat should not be attributed to a "stab in the back".

Wagnerian allusions
To some Germans, the idea of a "stab in the back" was evocative of Richard Wagner's 1876 opera Götterdämmerung, in which Hagen murders his enemy Siegfried – the hero of the story – with a spear in his back.
In Hindenburg's memoirs, he compared the collapse of the German army to Siegfried's death.

Psychology of belief
Historian Richard McMasters Hunt argues in a 1958 article that the myth was an irrational belief which commanded the force of irrefutable emotional convictions for millions of Germans. He suggests that behind these myths was a sense of communal shame, not for causing the war, but for losing it. Hunt argues that it was not the guilt of wickedness, but the shame of weakness that seized Germany's national psychology, and "served as a solvent of the Weimar democracy and also as an ideological cement of Hitler's dictatorship".

Equivalents in other countries

Parallel interpretations of national trauma after military defeat appear in other countries. For example, it was applied to the United States' involvement in the Vietnam War and in the mythology of the Lost Cause of the Confederacy.

See also

 Austria victim theory
 Causes of World War II
 Centre for the Study of the Causes of the War
 Defeatism
 Genocide justification
 German Revolution of 1918–19
 Holocaust inversion
 Jewish war conspiracy theory
 More German than the Germans, a contrasting trope about German Jewry.
 Secondary antisemitism

References
Informational notes

Citations

Bibliography

 

 
 
 

Further reading

External links

 Antisemitism on the Florida Holocaust Museum website
 Die Judischen Gefallenen A Roll of Honor Commemorating the 12,000 German Jews Who Died for their Fatherland in World War I.
 Book review by Harold Marcuse, with 15 "stab-in-the-back" illustrations, 1918–1942

Aftermath of World War I
Antisemitic canards
Antisemitism in Germany
Conspiracy theories in Germany
Conspiracy theories involving Jews
German nationalism
German Revolution of 1918–1919
Historical negationism
Historiography of World War I
Military history of Germany during World War II
Propaganda legends
Right-wing antisemitism
Victimology
Weimar Republic